Chợ Đồn is a rural district of Bắc Kạn province in the Northeast region of Vietnam. As of 2003 the district had a population of 49,296. The district covers an area of 913 km2. The district capital lies at Bằng Lũng.

Administrative divisions
The district is divided into one township Bằng Lũng (the district capital) and communes:

Bình Trung
Yên Nhuận
Nghĩa Tá
Lương Bằng
Phong Huân
Yên Mỹ
Đại Sảo
Bằng Lãng
Đông Viên
Rã Bản
Phương Viên
Ngọc Phái
Yên Thượng
Yên Thịnh
Bản Thi
Quảng Bạch
Bằng Phúc
Tân Lập
Đồng Lạc
Xuân Lạc
Nam Cường

References

Districts of Bắc Kạn province